Esther Morrison Gamberdella was born on May 26, 1931 in Chicago, Illinois. She played in the All-American Girls Professional Baseball League.  She both threw and batted right-handed. At 19 years old she was a mere five feet tall.  She never got married or had kids. She died on December 30, 2018, at 87.

Personal background
Esther was born into a rather loud Chicago neighbourhood.  She was given the nickname "Schmattze" (which means little rag in Jewish/Polish) by a girlfriend from her neighbourhood.  She earned the name as when playing ball she one time hit her whole body against the back fence, cut her face and was bleeding.  But she caught the ball anyway!  Indeed, Esther's childhood was spent playing ball with the boys and shining shoes for local kingpins.  One person she shined shoes for was Al Capone; she didn't know who he was but she shined his shoes as she was paid for it!

Baseball career
The AAGPBL recruited Esther after she followed some other neighborhood girls into a building at the Franklin Park playground. She was asked if she could play ball by someone and she responded in the affirmative.  She was then given a mitt when she told him she could play in the positions of: catcher, pitcher and outfielder. She used her stepfather's last name to register as she thought her Italian name Gamberdella would be too complicated to work with.

Esther played for the Chicago Colleens and the Springfield Sallies.  During this time, with the team she traveled to Georgia, Tennessee and New York.  She had to retire early from the league however, due to an undiagnosed case of severe anemia, explaining, that "every time [she] bent down for a ground ball, [her] nose would bleed. So [she] had to quit."

Along with the other AAGPBL Girls of Summer, Esther was inducted into the Baseball Hall of Fame in Cooperstown, NY, in 1988.

Retirement
Esther really missed her baseball days.  She went through a lot after she retired.  In 1988 she spent a whole year in hospital following a car accident and she also had rickets.  But she remained positive, saying "a lot of people have it worse than me."

Career statistics
Batting record

References

1931 births
Baseball players from Illinois
Living people
All-American Girls Professional Baseball League players
21st-century American women